Philip Livingston Jones, commonly credited by his mononym Livingston is an Indian actor, comedian and screenwriter who usually plays in supporting and comedy roles in Tamil films. He is credited as Ranjan in his earlier films such as Captain Prabhakaran (1991) and Sundara Purushan (1996) and is well known for playing the role of Natraj in the critically acclaimed movie Sollamale (1998). He has acted over 150 films.

Career
His first starring role was in Poonthotta Kaavalkaaran (1988). He started out playing villains and graduated to playing lead roles with Sundara Purushan (1996), Sollamale (1998), Viralukketha Veekkam (1999), En Purushan Kuzhandhai Maadhiri (2001) and Engalukkum Kaalam Varum (2001) are other films in which he has appeared in lead roles.  He also wrote the screenplay for the movies Kanni Rasi (1985) and Kaakki Sattai (1985) along with G. M. Kumar.

At the peak of his career in the late 1990s and early 2000s, Livingston opted to take on a mix of lead roles, antagonistic roles and cameo roles.

He later appeared in hit comedy films as supporting roles like Thillalangadi (2010), Kaavalan (2011), Idharkuthane Aasaipattai Balakumara (2013) and Magalir Mattum (2017).

Personal life

Livingston was born in a Christian  family  in Chennai, Tamilnadu.
His father, Samuel Jones worked as a supervisor in Binny and Co. ,while his mother was a homemaker who was of Malaysian Tamils descent. 
He attended ELM Fabricus Hr.Sec. School in Purasawalkam until grade 10 after which he pursued his cinema career.

On 6 September 1997, he married Jessy Irudayaraj a Roman Catholic in a private ceremony in Chennai. The couple has two daughters, Jovita (born in 1998) and Gemma (born in 2001).

Filmography

As film actor

1980–90s

2000s

2010s

2020s

As screenwriter

As Voice actor

Television

References

Tamil male actors
Living people
Indian male film actors
Male actors in Tamil cinema
Indian male screenwriters
Tamil screenwriters
Indian male comedians
Male actors in Telugu cinema
20th-century Indian male actors
21st-century Indian male actors
20th-century Indian dramatists and playwrights
1958 births